Kim Hyeon-ung (born 1994), better known as Bloo, is a rapper based in South Korea. He has released 2 full-length albums: Bloo in Wonderland 2 (2021) and Moon and Back (2021) as well as the extended plays Downtown Baby (2017), Bloo in Wonderland (2018), and It's Not Love I'm Just Drunk (2019). 

His 2017 single, "Downtown Baby," topped South Korean music charts in June 2020, after singer Lee Hyori performed it on the variety show Hangout With Yoo.

Discography

Studio album

Extended plays

Singles

References

External links 

 

1994 births
Living people
South Korean male rappers